Miller Brook flows into the Black River near Port Leyden, New York.

References 

Rivers of New York (state)